Nurhayati Ali Assegaf, M.Si., M.P. (born 17 July 1963, in Solo) is the Chairperson of Democratic Party Faction in the People's Representative Council (lower house) of the Republic of Indonesia and Deputy Chairperson of Democratic Party for 2013 - 2015. She used to be the Vice-Chairperson of the Committee for Inter-Parliamentary Cooperation. A member of the People's Representative Council since 2004, she was re-elected in 2009. During her first term (2004-2009) Dr. Assegaf was appointed Special Staff to the First Lady of the Republic of Indonesia. Alongside these duties, as a strong proponent of women’s empowerment and gender issues, she also hosted and directed the television programme “Women’s Perspective” on the Republic of Indonesia TV Channel (TVRI). Dr. Assegaf had been Managing Director of the Business and Financial Consultant (Assegaf & Partners Ltd., 1998-2004) and, before that, an Associate of Winarto Soemarto & Associates (1993-1998).

Her early activism in her university years and her strong engagement with political and social issues as well as international affairs moved Dr. Assegaf to become a patron and founder of a number of institutions and think-tanks dealing with issues pertaining to youth, women and children’s rights, democracy, and education. In 2003, she joined the Democratic Party, becoming active in the party’s organizational structure, including as Deputy Secretary-General and Chairperson of the Foreign Affairs Department.

Education

 Phd in Social and Political Studies, Gajah Mada University, Yogyakarta, Indonesia  
 Master's degree in American Studies, University of Indonesia, Jakarta  
 Under-Graduate Degree in Human Resources Management, STIA Majapahit, Malang, Indonesia 
 Diploma in Medical Faculty, Brawijaya University, Malang, Indonesia 
 Diploma in Public Relations, Los Angeles City College
 Regular Course – KRA SSSVI National Resilience Institute (LEMHANAS), Indonesia
 Harvard Kennedy School Executive Education, Leaders in Development: Managing Change in a Dynamic World, USA

National Parliament

In the course of her parliamentary activities since 2004, Dr. Assegaf has been involved in a number of Commissions in the People's Representative Council, notably Commission VI on Trade, Industry, Investment, Small and Medium-Scale Enterprises, State Enterprises, and National Standardization; and Commission I on Defense, Intelligence, Foreign Affairs, Communication and Information.

She is Chairperson of the Inter-Parliamentary Union (IPU- Indonesia) and of the Working Group on the Millennium Development Goals (MDGs), and Vice-Chairperson of the Committee for Inter-Parliamentary Cooperation. She also acts as Focal Point of the Indonesian House of Representatives for the UN Convention to Combat Desertification.

She is notorious with her comments and actions. She criticized the very popular governor of Jakarta, Joko Widodo ( now elected President of Indonesia) for fires in the capital. This comment earned her public wrath, public knew her comments were baseless and politically motivated. And now she is the motor of the condemned " walk out " during the voting in the Parliament, in which the Parliament reversed existing laws for governors and mayors to be elected by the people.

Inter-Parliamentary Union

Since joining the Indonesian delegation to the IPU conferences, Dr. Assegaf has been active both as a participant and chairperson in the meetings and committees of the IPU, in particular as a member of its Executive Committee and its Sub-Committee on Finance. She is President of the IPU Coordinating Committee of Women Parliamentarians.

Dr. Assegaf headed the Indonesian Delegation to the 124th IPU Assembly and related meetings in Panama City, Panama, in 2011, and to the 123rd IPU Assembly and related meetings in Geneva, Switzerland.
  
Believing strongly in the need to develop the regional dimension of parliamentary cooperation, Dr. Assegaf has played an active part in regional forums such as the Asian Parliamentary Assembly (APA); the ASEAN Inter-Parliamentary Assembly (AIPA); the Forum of Asia-Pacific Parliamentarians for Education (FASPPED); and the Parliamentary Union of OIC Member States (PUIC).

Asian Parliamentary Assembly (APA)
 Member of Indonesian delegation to the 5th APA Plenary Session, Damascus, Syria
 Proposer of the idea on the establishment of the Coordinating Meeting of APA Women Parliamentarians on the APA Executive Council Meeting in Jakarta, Indonesia
 Chairperson of Drafting Committee of Asian Parliamentary Assembly in Bandung,Indonesia 
 Member of the Steering Committee and Member of Indonesian delegation to the 4th APA Plenary Session in Bandung, Indonesia

References

External links
  broken link

1963 births
Living people
People from Surakarta
Members of the People's Representative Council, 2009
Members of the People's Representative Council, 2014
Gadjah Mada University alumni